Ferencvárosi Torna Club  is a Hungarian handball club from Budapest, that plays in the  Nemzeti Bajnokság I, the top level championship in Hungary.

Crest, colours, supporters

Naming history

Kit manufacturers and shirt sponsor
The following table shows in detail Ferencvárosi TC kit manufacturers and shirt sponsors by year:

Kits

Sports Hall information

Name: – Elek Gyula Aréna
City: – Budapest, IX. ker
Capacity: – 1300
Address: – 1101 Budapest, Kőbányai út 47./A

Management

Team

Current squad 

Squad for the 2022–23 season

Technical staff
 Head coach:  István Pásztor
 Goalkeeping coach:  Zsolt Ocsovai
 Fitness coach:  Ábel Nagy
 Physiotherapist:  Dorottya Zsembery
 Masseur:  Máté Varga
 Club doctor:  Dr. Balázs Sárdy

Transfers

Transfers for the 2023–24 season

Joining 
  Lukáš Urban (LB) (from  HT Tatran Prešov) 
  Márk Hegedűs (LP) (from  Gyöngyösi KK)

Leaving 
  Bálint Pordán (LP) (to  ?)
  Jakub Mikita (LB) (to ?)

Transfers for the 2022–23 season

Joining 
  Máté Lékai (CB) from  Telekom Veszprém
  Zsolt Balogh (RB) from  Grundfos Tatabánya KC
  Ádám Borbély (GK) from  Veszprém KKFT Felsőörs
  Ádám Török (CB) from  Dabas KK
  Kristóf Csörgő (CB) from  Mezőkövesdi KC

Leaving 
  Božo Anđelić (CB) to  HC Motor Zaporizhzhia
  Marián Žernovič (GK) to  TSV St. Otmar St. Gallen
  Xavér Deményi (GK) to  NEKA
  Szabolcs Tóth (CB) to  Budakalász FKC
  Márk Vári (RB) to  Balatonfüredi KSE
  Péter Kende (CB) to  Ceglédi KKSE
  Miklós Karai (LP) on loan at  NEKA
  Félix Turák (LP) on loan at  Budai Farkasok KKUK

Previous squads

Top scorers

Honours

Individual awards

Domestic
Nemzeti Bajnokság I Top Scorer

Recent seasons

Seasons in Nemzeti Bajnokság I: 8
Seasons in Nemzeti Bajnokság I/B: 5
Seasons in Nemzeti Bajnokság II:

European competition

EHF Cup Winners' Cup: from the 2012–13 season, the men's competition was merged with the EHF Cup.EHF Cup: It was formerly known as the IHF Cup until 1993. Also, starting from the 2012–13 season the competition has been merged with the EHF Cup Winners' Cup. The competition will be known as the EHF European League from the 2020–21 season.

European record
As of 10 September 2022:

Overall results by opponent and country

EHF ranking

Former club members

Notable former players

 Gábor Ancsin
 György Bakos
 Sándor Bohács
 Bendegúz Bujdosó
 Mohamed Yassine Benmiloud
 Dávid Debreczeni
 Gábor Grebenár
 Péter Kovacsics
 Bence Nagy
 Máté Nagy
 Gábor Pálos
 Bálint Pordán
 Timuzsin Schuch
 Marinko Kelečević (2010–2011)
  Igor Kos (2010–2011)
 Khaled Essam
 Teimuraz Orjonikidze
 Božo Anđelić
 Rade Mijatović
 Nikola Ivanović
 Jakub Mikita
 Marián Žernovič

Former coaches

See also 
 Ferencvárosi TC

References

External links
 Official website
 

Hungarian handball clubs
Ferencvárosi TC